Fy or FY may refer to:

Places:
 FY postcode area for Blackpool, England
 North Macedonia (NATO country code), a country in southeastern Europe
 Fengyang, China

In science and technology:
 Yield Strength, in engineering and materials science
 Fengyun, a series of Chinese weather satellites
 Feynmanium (137Fy), a nickname for untriseptium (Uts), chemical element 137
 Convair XFY Pogo, an experimental "tailsitter" aircraft

Other uses:
 Fushigi Yûgi, a Japanese manga series
 Firefly (airline) (IATA code), an airline based in Kuala Lumpur, Malaysia
 Fiscal year or financial year, a 12-month period used for calculating annual financial reports
 West Frisian language (ISO 639-1 language code), a language spoken mostly in the province of Friesland, Netherlands
FY, a Greek rapper